The Naval Information Warfare Center Atlantic (NIWC Atlantic) is an Echelon III activity of the United States Navy located in North Charleston, South Carolina.

The center’s mission is to deliver information warfare solutions that
protect national security. This includes communication systems (radios), networking systems (routers/switches), cyber operations (red team/forensics/network defense), intelligence, surveillance, reconnaissance (sensors/decision support applications), business systems (benefits/personnel) and information security.

Effective February 18, 2019, the names of the systems center changed from Space and Naval Warfare Systems Center Atlantic (SPAWAR) to Naval Information Warfare Center Atlantic.

Structure of NAVWAR
NIWC Atlantic is one of three Echelon III activities reporting to the Commander, Naval Information Warfare Systems Command (NAVWARSYSCOM) in San Diego, California. NAVWARSYSCOM, and Echelon II command, in turn reports to the Echelon I  Chief of Naval Operations on the military side, and the Assistant Secretary of the Navy (Research, Development and Acquisition) on the civilian side.

The other two Echelon III activities under NAVWARSYSCOM are the Naval Information Warfare Center Pacific and NAVWAR Space Field Activity.

Locations and Personnel
NIWC Atlantic is headquartered at the Naval Support Activity Charleston in Hanahan, South Carolina, which is part of Joint Base Charleston. The center is staffed by almost 5,000 personnel, with 53% in science and engineering occupations.

In the Charleston area, about 3,300 personnel perform most activities in 79 buildings centered around the HQ Building in the southwestern corner of NSA Charleston, with the exception of Electromagnetic Interference (EMI) Testing in Poseidon Park. Two integration facilities reside on the grounds of the former Charleston Naval Shipyard.

Other major locations which are part of NIWC Atlantic include:
Just over 1,000 personnel in Hampton Roads, Virginia, co-located with Fleet Forces Command and NAVIFOR.
About 230 personnel in New Orleans, Louisiana.
About 175 personnel in the National Capital Region, Washington, DC.
About 270 personnel in satellite locations in:
Tampa, Florida
Stuttgart, Germany
Naval Station Rota, Spain
Naples, Italy
Manama, Bahrain
Antarctica

Organization
NIWC Atlantic activities are organized into 5 departments with 120 integrated product teams and almost 450 projects.

The five departments are (with FY 2019 numbers):
 Fleet C4I and Readiness: About 1,675 personnel and 150 projects.
 Expeditionary Warfare: About 575 personnel and 62 projects.
 Enterprise Systems: About 475 personnel and 44 projects.
 Shore C2ISR and Integration: About 700 personnel and 254 projects.
 Science and Technology: About 80 personnel and 53 projects.

See also
Naval Information Warfare Center Pacific
NAVWAR Space Field Activity

References

External links

United States Navy installations
Military intelligence
Military in South Carolina
Organizations based in Charleston, South Carolina